Ariel Muçollari (born 19 April 2001) is an Albanian footballer who plays as a defender for Flamurtari in the Kategoria e Parë.

Career

Flamurtari
A graduate of the club's youth academy, Muçollari made his competitive debut for the club on 13 December 2017, coming on as a 65th-minute substitute for Xhonatan Merkaj in a 5-2 Cup victory over Turbina. It was in this match that Muçollari scored his first senior goal for the club, netting eight minutes after coming on and making the score 5-1 in favor of Flamurtari. Nearly two years later, he made his Albanian Superliga debut, playing the entirety of a 1-0 away defeat to Skënderbeu in August 2019.

References

External links

2001 births
Living people
Flamurtari Vlorë players
Kategoria Superiore players
Sportspeople from Vlorë
Association football defenders
Footballers from Vlorë
Albanian footballers